Gross indecency can refer to:

 Gross indecency, a criminal offense
 Gross Indecency: The Three Trials of Oscar Wilde, a 1997 play written by Moisés Kaufman.